Peksha is a rural locality (a village) and the administrative center of Pekshinskoye Rural Settlement, Petushinsky District, Vladimir Oblast, Russia. The population was 907 as of 2010. There are 15 streets.

Geography 
Peksha is located on the Peksha River, 19 km east of Petushki (the district's administrative centre) by road. Cherkasovo is the nearest rural locality.

References 

Rural localities in Petushinsky District